Târgu Trotuș is a commune in Bacău County, Western Moldavia, Romania. It is composed of three villages: Târgu Trotuș, Tuta (Diószeg) and Viișoara (Viszóra).

At the 2002 census, 99.9% of inhabitants were ethnic Romanians. 63.3% were Roman Catholic and 36.5% Romanian Orthodox.

Natives
 Jeremiah of Wallachia

References

External links 

 History of Târgu Trotuș from the Târgu Trotuș Townhall 

Communes in Bacău County
Localities in Western Moldavia